Muskrat Scrambler is a steel roller coaster located at the now abandoned Six Flags New Orleans in Louisiana. Manufactured by L&T Systems, the ride opened in the Jazzland section of the park on May 20, 2000. The roller coaster ceased operation following the abrupt closure of the amusement park as a result of the impact from Hurricane Katrina in 2005. It is currently standing but not operating.

History
Two years after Six Flags took control of the park, Hurricane Katrina devastated the surrounding area on August 29, 2005. In 2007, Six Flags started to remove rides from the park. Batman: The Ride was removed in 2007 and taken to Six Flags Fiesta Texas and reopened as Goliath in 2008. Bayou Blaster and Sonic Slam were removed in 2008 and taken to Great Escape and reopened as Sasquatch in 2009. The Road Runner Express was removed in 2009 and taken to Six Flags Magic Mountain and reopened in 2011 under the same name. However, Muskrat Scrambler still remains at the closed amusement park with wooden coaster Mega Zeph, along with other attractions. The park has been closed since 2005 and is no longer a Six Flags park; it is now owned by the city of New Orleans. Despite Six Flags severing the park's lease in 2009, all Looney Tunes and DC Comics theming was kept intact.

References

Former roller coasters in Louisiana
Roller coasters operated by Six Flags
Six Flags New Orleans